Garima Singh is an Indian politician and was a member of the 17th Legislative Assembly of Uttar Pradesh in India. Singh represented the Amethi Vidhan Sabha constituency, which is in Amethi district, Uttar Pradesh.

Personal life
Garima Singh is legally married to another politician,   Sanjaya Sinh   (also known as  Sanjay Singh). Sanjaya claims to be married to Ameeta Singh, the widow of Syed Modi, but Garima successfully contested the legitimacy of that marriage. Both the High Court and Supreme Court of India have declared the alleged mutual divorce between herself and Sanjay in 1995, which preceded his marriage to Ameeta, to be null and void. Sanjay has accepted the court rulings but maintains that Ameeta is his only legally wedded wife. Garima and Sanjay have a son and two daughters.

Sanjay Singh was adopted by the king of Amethi, Rananjay Singh, as his heir prior to the abolition of all royal privileges in India and as such he inherited the former royal estates. In 1989, he had removed his wife Garima from the palace after beginning a relationship with Ameeta, who had recently been widowed. In 2014, Garima and her children took up residence at another palace in Amethi, called Bhupati Bhawan, and refused to move. Local people gathered to support her, claiming that she, rather than Ameeta, was the real queen. Amidst claim and counter-claim, Anant Vikram Singh, who is Sanjay's son, has had the support of his mother in alleging that Ameeta has been undermining his future inheritance of various formerly royal properties. Sanjay denies the allegations, and also denies claims that the local people are not being looked after by the family in the manner that is customary. Garima claims that she entered the palace in support of her children, who all blame Ameeta for the troubles that have arisen since Sanjay and Ameeta began their relationship.

Political career
Singh contested the 2017 Uttar Pradesh Assembly election as a Bharatiya Janata Party candidate and defeated her nearest competitor, Gayatri Prasad from the Samajwadi Party, with a margin of 5,065 votes. Another contestant in that election was Ameeta Singh, who stood as an Indian National Congress candidate. The BJP hoped to win the seat by exploiting local sympathy for Garima, who is a relative of V. P. Singh, a former Prime Minister of India. Both women named Sanjay Singh as their spouse in their election affidavits. BJP spokespeople claimed the result was indeed one based on elector's feelings about the long-running family drama.

References

Living people
Bharatiya Janata Party politicians from Uttar Pradesh
People from Amethi
Uttar Pradesh MLAs 2017–2022
Year of birth missing (living people)